A cube is any regular, six-sided, three-dimensional solid object.

Cube may also refer to:

Arts and entertainment
 Alamo (sculpture) or The Cube in New York, U.S. (and Endover at the University of Michigan)
 Cube Interactive, an interactive media company in Wales, UK
 Cube Route, a fantasy novel by Piers Anthony
 Time Cube, a conspiracy theory website

Comics
 Cosmic Cube, a fictional object in Marvel Comics

Films
 Cube (film series), a series of films including:
 Cube (1997 film), a 1997 Canadian film
 Cube 2: Hypercube, the 2002 sequel to Cube
 Cube Zero, the 2004 prequel to Cube
 Cube (2021 film), a 2021 Japanese remake of the 1997 film
 The Cube (film), a 1969 television film by Jim Henson

Games

 Cube (video game), a 2001 first-person shooter computer game
 Cube 2: Sauerbraten, sequel to Cube
 AssaultCube, based on Cubes game engine
 The Cube (game), a psychological exercise in Kokology
 Intelligent Qube, a PS and mobile puzzler game 
 GameCube, a video game console
 Q*bert, a 1982 arcade game (named Cubes in development)
 Q.U.B.E. (Quick Understanding of Block Extrusion), a 2011 indie puzzler
 Cube (collectible card game variation), a variation of gameplay for collectible card games
 Rubik's Cube, a six-coloured mechanical puzzle game
 Helicopter Cube, a Rubik's Cube-like puzzle invented by Adam G
 Sudoku Cube, a variation on a Rubik's Cube
 Pocket Cube, the 2×2×2 version of a Rubik's Cube
 Professor's Cube, a mechanical puzzle, a 5×5×5 version of the Rubik's Cube
 Void Cube, a 3-D mechanical puzzle similar to a Rubik's Cube

Music
 Cube Entertainment, a South Korean record label
 Cube Records, a British record label
 Cube (talent agency), a Japanese music production company and talent agency

Television
 The Cube (game show), a British TV game show where tasks are completed from inside a cube
 The Power of Three (Doctor Who), working title of the fourth episode of the seventh series of Doctor Who
 Cube Tv, a television channel from South Korea.

Buildings
 The Cube (building), part of The Mailbox in Birmingham, UK
 The Cube (restaurant), a travelling pop-up restaurant
 Kaaba (English: The Cube), a sacred site in Mecca, Saudi Arabia
 Cube Microplex, a non-profit cinema and venue in Bristol, UK
 The Qube (Vancouver), a distinctive "hanging" building in Canada
 The Qube (Detroit), a financial center in Michigan, US
 Beijing National Aquatics Center, China, The Water Cube

Science and technology
 CuBe, an alloy of copper and beryllium
 Cubé, a flowering plant of the legume family

Mathematics
 Cube (algebra), the third power of a number
 Necker cube, an optical illusion
 Cube attack, a cryptanalytic technique
 lambda cube (λ-cube), a framework of constructive logic

Computing
 Data cube, a three- (or higher) dimensional array of values
 OLAP cube, an extension to a spreadsheet's two-dimensional array optimized for multidimensional analysis
 Cubes (OLAP server), a light-weight open source multidimensional modelling and OLAP toolkit
 NeXTcube, workstation (1990–1993)
 Power Mac G4 Cube (2000–2001), a small form factor Apple Macintosh personal computer

People
 Ice Cube (born 1969), American rapper, often referred to simply as "Cube"
 Irma von Cube (1899–1977), German-American screenwriter
 Mary Cagle (born 1989), American comiccer, known also as Cube or Cube Watermelon.

Other uses
 Cubicle, a type of office workspace
 Cube Bikes, a German bicycle manufacturer
 Nissan Cube, a multi-purpose vehicle from Nissan

See also
 Gelatinous cube, a monster in Dungeons & Dragons and other role-playing games
 White Cube, a defunct contemporary art gallery in London, UK
 Onizuka Air Force Station, California, US, nicknamed The Blue Cube
 ColorQube, a brand of color printers and copiers produced by Xerox; see Solid ink
 Nintendo GameCube, the fourth home console by Nintendo, released in 2001
 
 
 Cubic (disambiguation)
 Qube (disambiguation)
 Cuba (disambiguation)